Excelsior Springs Hall of Waters Commercial East Historic District is a national historic district located at Excelsior Springs, Clay County, Missouri.  It encompasses 24 contributing buildings and 2 contributing structures in the central business district of Excelsior Springs. The district developed between about 1894 and 1948, and includes representative examples of Victorian architecture.  The central feature of the district, the separately listed Hall of Waters, is a five level, Art Deco / Depression Modern style reinforced concrete building. Other notable buildings include the Flanders Dry Goods Store (c. 1900-1905), A.M. Howard Drug Store (1905-1909), Clay County State Bank (1906), The Huey Building (1908), Oriental Bazaar Gift Store (1908), The Excelsior Baths and Broadway Rooms (c. 1913-1922), Fraternal Order of Eagles Lodge Hall (c. 1905-1909), The Kennedy Building (1902), First National Bank Building (c. 1900-1905), The Francis Hotel (c.
1905–1909, c. 1917-1922), and The Auditorium (c. 1905-1909).

It was listed on the National Register of Historic Places in 1999.

References

Historic districts on the National Register of Historic Places in Missouri
Victorian architecture in Missouri
Art Deco architecture in Missouri
Modernist architecture in Missouri
Buildings and structures in Clay County, Missouri
National Register of Historic Places in Clay County, Missouri